Double Commander is a free and open-source multi-platform two-panel orthodox file manager that is inspired by the Microsoft Windows-only Total Commander.

Features 
 Directories (all or only selected) can be compared and synchronized both symmetrically (two-way) and asymmetrically (one-way).
This feature shows differences between two locations by directory and sub-directory, and can make a fully automatic backup of files that have been added, changed or deleted.
 Two similar panels with an optional tree view panel, synchronized with the others. Navigation through folders in the tree view panel is reflected (in real time) in the active standard panel and vice versa.
Panels can be duplicated from one side to the other. Panels can represent original directories compared to copied or backed-up ones. These can then be matched in more detail in the synchronize directory feature. 
 Tabbed navigation
Tabs are for directories. Sets of tabs can be saved to files that can be reloaded to produce the same two panels and their tabs that one set up and saved. Tabs can be configured to allow no changes to them, or to open sub-directories in new tabs, so that the original tab remains intact and available.
 Bookmarks
 Brief or full view of files
 Flat view, which is a list of files in subfolders of any level
 Images can be viewed also as thumbnails of user-defined sizes
 Several sort options
 Archive support (zip, 7z, tar, bz2, tbz, gz, tgz, lzma, tlz)
 Files (and folders) in archives are handled as if they were in an ordinary disk partition. All decompression and compression processes work in the background.
 Customizable keyboard shortcuts
 Multi-rename tool, that supports regular expressions and flat view, which allows to rename files in subfolders
 Various search options include regular expressions and search for duplicates.
 Checksum generation and verification
 Visual file comparison/diff. While comparing, both files can be edited and saved, also in a binary mode.
 Built in file viewer to view files in a text, binary, hex or decimal format.
 Built in text editor with syntax highlighting.
 HTML files are displayed in a simple offline browser, provided by an attached plugin.
 A mechanism for creating, maintaining and displaying file comments (4DOS descript.ion)
 Files can be wiped securely
 All operations can be queued in the background
 Unicode support
 Supports Total Commander WCX, WDX and WLX Windows plug-ins
 Officially released portable versions for Windows, Linux, and FreeBSD

See also 
Comparison of file managers
Comparison of FTP client software

References

External links 
 

Free file managers
Orthodox file managers
File comparison tools
Free software programmed in Pascal
Cross-platform software
Cross-platform free software
Pascal (programming language) software